Granigyra pruinosa is a species of sea snail, a marine gastropod mollusk, unassigned in the superfamily Seguenzioidea.

Description
The size of the shell varies between 2.5 mm and 6.2 mm. The small, semitransparent shell is narrowly rimate. It is frosted by minute numerous white tubercles, which are partly embedded in the substance of the shell,. On one specimen there are slight spiral lines below the deep suture. The four whorls are swollen and rapidly increasing in size.

Distribution
This species occurs in European waters off Ireland, the Bay of Biscay and Portugal.

References

 Gofas, S.; Le Renard, J.; Bouchet, P. (2001). Mollusca, in: Costello, M.J. et al. (Ed.) (2001). European register of marine species: a check-list of the marine species in Europe and a bibliography of guides to their identification. Collection Patrimoines Naturels, 50: pp. 180–213

External links
  Serge GOFAS, Ángel A. LUQUE, Joan Daniel OLIVER,José TEMPLADO & Alberto SERRA (2021) - The Mollusca of Galicia Bank (NE Atlantic Ocean); European Journal of Taxonomy 785: 1–114
 

pruiinosa
Gastropods described in 1883